Daniel Swan may refer to:
 Daniel Swan (musician), member of the band The Cortinas
 Daniel C. Swan, American cultural anthropologist and museum curator